The 1986 Copa Libertadores was the 27th edition of the Copa Libertadores, CONMEBOL's annual international club tournament. River Plate won the competition for the first time ever.

Group stage

Group 1

Group 2

Group 3

Group 4

Group 5 

 The representatives of Venezuela, Estudiantes de Mérida and Unión Atlético Táchira, did not participate upon the Venezuelan Football Federation's suspension by FIFA.

Semifinals

Group 1

Group 2

Finals

1st leg

2nd leg

River Plate won 3–1 on aggregate.

External links 
 Sitio oficial de la CONMEBOL
 Libertadores 1986 at RSSSF.com
 River in Copa Libertadores 1986

1
Copa Libertadores seasons